The Ulster Senior Cup is a knock-out competition for senior rugby union teams in the province of Ulster. It is administered by Ulster Rugby.

The most successful club is Queen's University with 23 wins. The current holders are City of Armagh RFC.

The winners compete with the other three provincial cup winners for the All-Ireland Cup.

Entry requirements

Entry is currently restricted to rugby clubs from Ulster that play in the All-Ireland League.

Performance by club

Finals

1880s

 1884-85 NIFC (North of Ireland) 19-4 Lisburn
 1885-86 Queen's College 6-0 Albion
 1886-87 Queen's College 5-0 NIFC
 1887-88 Lisburn 5-0 Albion
 1888-89 Albion 4-3 Queen's College

1890s

 1889-90 Queen's College 13-0 Albion
 1890-91 Queen's College 8-0 Albion
 1891-92 Queen's College 6-0 Albion
 1892-93 NIFC 3-0 Queen's College (After extra time in Replay)
 1893-94 NIFC 11-8 Collegians
 1894-95 NIFC 3-0 Collegians
 1895-96 NIFC 11-3 Collegians
 1896-97 NIFC 9-3 Queen's College
 1897-98 NIFC 13-0 Queen's College
 1898-99 NIFC 16-3 Collegians

1900s

 1899-1900 Queen's College 16-0 Holywood
 1900-01 NIFC 14-0 Dungannon
 1901-02 NIFC 6-0 Malone
 1902-03 Queen's College 6-0 NIFC
 1903-04 Malone 10-3 Queen's College
 1904-05 Malone 8-5 Fortwilliam
 1905-06 Collegians 8-0 NIFC
 1906-07 Malone 13-3 Collegians
 1907-08 NIFC 10-0 Knock
 1908-09 Queen's University 16-6 NIFC

1910s

 1909-10 Collegians 10-6 Queen's University
 1910-11 Knock 6-5 NIFC
 1911-12 Queen's University 13-0 Malone
 1912-13 Collegians 9-3 Knock
 1913-14 All Senior Rugby was suspended in early 1914 due to the Home Rule crisis and the Senior Cup was not played.
 1914-1919 Not played due to World War I

1920s

 1919-20 NIFC 5-0 Queen's University
 1920-21 Queen's University 19-6 NIFC (at Balmoral)
 1921-22 Instonians 8-0 Queen's University (at Balmoral)
 1922-23 Instonians 19-5 Queen's University (at Balmoral)
 1923-24 Queen's University 16-8 Instonians (at Ravenhill)
 1924-25 Queen's University 14-3 Instonians (at Ravenhill)
 1925-26 Collegians 11-3 Queen's University (at Ravenhill)
 1926-27 Instonians 8-3 NIFC (after extra time)
 1927-28 Instonians 3-0 NIFC
 1928-29 Instonians 23-13 NIFC

1930s

 1929-30 NIFC 6-4 Queen's University
 1930-31 Instonians 7-3 Collegians
 1931-32 Queen's University 10-3 Collegians
 1932-33 Queen's University 18-6 Malone
 1933-34 Instonians 11-6 Civil Service
 1934-35 NIFC 15-0 Queen's University
 1935-36 Queen's University 11-0 NIFC (Replay – Game 1: 0-0)
 1936-37 Queen's University 5-0 Collegians
 1937-38 Instonians 11-6 NIFC
 1938-39 NIFC 20-0 Malone

1940s

 1939-1945 Not Played
 1945-46 Instonians 6-0 NIFC
 1946-47 Queen's University 16-11 Collegians
 1947-48 Instonians 12-10 C.I.Y.M.S.
 1948-49 Instonians 13-9 Queen's University

1950s

 1949-50 Instonians 11-0 Malone
 1950-51 Queen's University 15-0 NIFC
 1951-52 Collegians 8-3 Queen's University
 1952-53 C.I.Y.M.S. 9-6 Collegians
 1953-54 Instonians 6-0 Queen's University
 1954-55 NIFC 17-3 Queen's University
 1955-56 Instonians 6-3 C.I.Y.M.S.
 1956-57 Instonians 6-3 Ballymena
 1957-58 Instonians 3-0 Ballymena
 1958-59 Queen's University beat C.I.Y.M.S.

1960s

 1959-60 Queen's University 14-3 Instonians
 1960-61 Collegians 6-3 Ballymena
 1961-62 Collegians 8-0 Queen's University
 1962-63 Ballymena 8-0 Collegians
 1963-64 Dungannon 6-0 C.I.Y.M.S.
 1964-65 Instonians 9-6 Malone
 1965-66 C.I.Y.M.S. 29-6 Queen's University
 1966-67 C.I.Y.M.S. 3-0 Dungannon
 1967-68 Dungannon 12-6 Instonians
 1968-69 NIFC 23-11 Dungannon

1970s

 1969-70 Ballymena beat C.I.Y.M.S.
 1970-71 Malone 6-3 NIFC
 1971-72 C.I.Y.M.S. 22-18 Ballymena
 1972-73 NIFC 25-12 Malone
 1973-74 C.I.Y.M.S. 16-6 Bangor
 1974-75 Ballymena 13-3 C.I.Y.M.S.
 1975-76 Dungannon 12-9 Instonians
 1976-77 Ballymena 14-4 NIFC
 1977-78 C.I.Y.M.S. 14-12 Ballymena
 1978-79 Instonians 9-6 NIFC

1980s

 1979-80 Bangor 10-6 Instonians
 1980-81 Queen's University 16-12 Collegians
 1981-82 Bangor 26-7 Carrickfergus
 1982-83 Collegians 11-6 City of Derry
 1983-84 Malone 19-12 NIFC
 1984-85 Ards 19-7 Instonians
 1985-86 Bangor beat Malone
 1986-87 Ards beat Bangor
 1987-88 Malone beat Bangor
 1988-89 Ballymena beat Bangor

1990s

 1989-90 Ballymena 17-9 Malone
 1990-91 Ballymena 13-0 Bangor
 1991-92 Malone 13-3 NIFC
 1992-93 Dungannon 20-18 Ballymena
 1993-94 Dungannon 14-10 Instonians
 1994-95 Dungannon 21-16 Instonians
 1995-96 Ballymena beat Malone
 1996-97 Ballymena 20-13 Malone
 1997-98 Dungannon beat Malone
 1998-99 Instonians beat Malone

2000s

 1999-2000 City of Derry beat Dungannon
 2000-01 Belfast Harlequins 41-12 Dungannon
 2001-02 Dungannon 32-3 Ballynahinch
 2002-03 Ballymena 44-3 Dungannon
 2003-04 Ballymena 11-3 Ballynahinch
 2004-05 Ballymena 22-20 Belfast Harlequins
 2005-06 Belfast Harlequins 36-9 Malone
 2006-07 Dungannon 27-10 Belfast Harlequins
 2007-08 Belfast Harlequins 22-17 Ballymena
 2008-09 Ballynahinch 19-0 Ballymena

2010s

 2009-10 Queen's University 37-0 Malone
 2010-11 Dungannon 25-0 City of Derry
 2011-12 Ballymena 17-11 Banbridge
 2012-13 Ballymena 25-6 Rainey Old Boys
 2013-14 Queen's University 16-10 Ballynahinch
 2014-15 Ballynahinch 17-10 Malone
 2015-16 Ballynahinch 19-10 Ballymena
 2016-17 Ballynahinch 27-10 Dungannnon
 2017-18 Armagh 17-13 Ballymena
 2018-19 Armagh 9-7 Ballymena

2020s

 2019-20 Armagh 38-34 Ballynahinch
 2020-21 Not played due to COVID-19 pandemic
 2021-22 Queen's University 40-22 City of Armagh

See also
 Connacht Senior Cup
 Leinster Senior Cup
 Munster Senior Cup

Sources

Rugby union competitions in Ulster
Irish senior rugby competitions
1884 establishments in Ireland